The Afghanistan National Disaster Management Authority (ANDMA), also called the Ministry of Disaster Management, is a ministry and authority of Afghanistan. It was established on 16 February 1973 as the Department of Disaster Preparedness (DDP).

The currently responsible minister is Mohammad Abbas Akhund.

Ministers

References

External links
Official site - English

Government ministries of Afghanistan
Disasters in Afghanistan